St. Michael's School or St. Michael School may refer to:

Australia
 St Michael's Collegiate School, Hobart, Tasmania
 St Michael's Grammar School, Melbourne
 St Michael's Parish School, Ashburton, Victoria

Barbados
 The St. Michael School, Saint Michael, Barbados

Canada
 Saint Michael Catholic High School (Niagara Falls, Ontario)
 St. Michael Catholic Secondary School, Stratford, Ontario
 St. Michael's Choir School, Toronto, Ontario
 St. Michael's College School, Toronto, Ontario
 Saint Michael's School (Simcoe-Walsh), Ontario
 St. Michaels University School, Victoria, British Columbia

India
 St. Michael's School, Kannur
 St. Micheal's L. P. School, Kottapuram
 St. Michael's High School, Patna
 St. Michael's School, Durgapur

Ireland (Republic of)
 St Michael's Loreto Secondary School (Navan)

Malaysia
St. Michael's Secondary School, Sandakan, Sabah
St. Michael's Institution, Ipoh, Perak

Malta
 St. Michael School (Malta), Santa Venera, Malta

New Zealand
 St Michael's Church School, Christchurch

Singapore
 Saint Michael's School, now St. Joseph's Institution, Singapore

South Africa
 St. Michael's School, Bloemfontein, Free State

Sri Lanka
 St. Michael's College National School, Batticaloa

United Kingdom
 St Michael's School, Llanelli, Carmarthenshire, Wales
 St Michael and All Angels Catholic Primary School, Barnsley, South Yorkshire
 St Michael's Catholic Grammar School, Finchley, London
 St Michael's Catholic High School, Watford, Hertfordshire
 St Michael's Catholic School, High Wycombe, Buckinghamshire
 St Michael's Church of England Combined School, Stewkley, Buckinghamshire
 St Michael's Church of England High School, Chorley, Lancashire
 St Michael's Church of England High School, Crosby, Merseyside
 St Michael's Church of England High School, Rowley Regis, West Midlands
 St Michael's Church of England Middle School, Colehill, Dorset
 St Michael's College, Enniskillen, Enniskillen, County Fermanagh, Northern Ireland
 St Michael's Grammar School, Lurgan, County Armagh, Northern Ireland
 St Michael's Preparatory School, Jersey, Channel Islands
 St Michael's Primary School, Winterbourne, Gloucestershire
 St Michael's Prep School, Otford, Kent

United States
 St. Michael High School, St. Michaels, Arizona
 St. Michael's Preparatory School (Silverado, California)
 St. Michael Elementary School, Louisville, Kentucky
 St. Michael the Archangel High School (East Baton Rouge Parish, Louisiana) - Shenandoah, Louisiana
 St. Michael School (Frostburg, Maryland)
 St. Michael-Albertville High School, Minnesota
 St. Michael the Archangel Catholic High School, Lee's Summit, Missouri
 Saint Michael's School (Cranford, New Jersey)
 St. Michael's High School, Santa Fe, New Mexico
 St. Michael the Archangel Catholic School - Cary, North Carolina
 Saint Michael the Archangel High School (Fredericksburg, Virginia)

See also
 St. Michael Academy (disambiguation)
 St. Michael's College (disambiguation)
 Saint Michael (disambiguation)